Milison Niasexe (born 16 February 1986 in Toliara) is a Malagasy footballer, who currently plays for Anse Réunion FC.

International career
He is a member of Madagascar national team.

References

1986 births
Living people
Malagasy footballers
Madagascar international footballers
Expatriate footballers in Seychelles
Association football forwards